Aldo Roberto Boccaccini (born 2 September 1962 in San Rafael, Argentina) is a nuclear engineer and material scientist. He is currently a Professor of Biomaterials and Head of the Institute of Biomaterials at the Department of Materials Science and Engineering, University of Erlangen-Nuremberg, Erlangen, Germany.

Biography

Boccaccini studied 2 years of electromechanical engineering at Universidad Tecnologica Nacional, in San Rafael, Argentina, and earned his engineering degree in Nuclear Engineering at Instituto Balseiro, S. C. de Bariloche, Argentina in 1987.  He then moved to Germany and carried out his doctoral studies at RWTH Aachen, where he earned his doctoral degree (Dr.-Ing) in 1994. He then held postdoctoral positions in the UK at University of Birmingham, School of Metallurgy and Materials and in the USA, University of California, San Diego. In 2001 Boccaccini received his habilitation at Technical University Ilmenau, Germany. In 2000 Boccaccini joined the Department of Materials at Imperial College London (UK), where he was appointed Professor of Materials Science and Engineering in 2008. In 2009 Boccaccini moved to Germany as Professor for Biomaterials and Head of the Institute of Bomaterials at University of Erlangen-Nuremberg. He was appointed chair of the Department of Materials Science and Engineering from 2017 to 2019. In 2022 Boccaccini was named "Outstanding Personality" of his hometown San Rafael, Mendoza, Argentina.

Academic work

The fields of research of Boccaccini in the broad field of materials science and engineering focus on biomaterials for a variety of biomedical applications. In particular his research focuses on bioactive glasses and composites, bioactive coatings, tissue engineering scaffolds and drug delivery systems. He is also a pioneer of the field of electrophoretic deposition applied to biomedical and functional materials. Boccaccini is also member of the Advisory Board of the Network of Argentine Scientists in Germany and an international advisor to the Ministry of Science, Technology and Innovative Production of Argentina since 2008. Boccaccini is also a member of the council of the European Society for Biomaterials (ESB) serving, since 2019, as vice-president of ESB. He is also the vice-president of the Federation of European Materials Society (FEMS). Since 2018, Boccaccini has also been a full member of the German Academy of Science and Engineering, acatech. In 2022, Boccaccini was conferred an Honorary Doctorate by Åbo Akademi University, in Turku, Finland.

Publications

Prof. Boccaccini is the editor-in-chief of the journal Materials Letters and the founding editor-in-chief of the Open Access journal Biomedical Glasses (launched in 2014). He has published more than 900 research papers, he has co-edited 5 books, more than 20 book chapters. Boccaccini is a highly cited researcher, according to the Highly Cited 2014 list published by Thomson Reuters. To date (August 2022) he has been cited more than 76.000 times and has an h-index of 121 as listed in Google Scholar. In 2018, Boccaccini was again included in Clarivate Analytics' list of the most cited scientists.

References

External links
 Friedrich Alexander Universität Erlangen-Nürnberg
Imperial College London
 American Ceramics Society, ACERS
 Deutsche Gesellschaft für Materialkunde e.V., DGM
 Institute of Materials, Minerals and Mining, IOM3
 Netzwerk Argentinischer Wissenschaftler in Deutschland, RCAA
Deutsche Akademie der Technikwissenschaften, acatech
Federation of European Materials Society, FEMS
European Society of Biomaterials, ESB
Clarivate Analytics

1962 births
Living people
Academics of Imperial College London
Academics of the University of Birmingham
National Technological University alumni
Nuclear engineers
RWTH Aachen University alumni
University of California, San Diego faculty